At   tall, The Westin Leipzig is actually at the second rank of the tallest buildings in Leipzig. The house, built for the GDR hotel operator Interhotel as Hotel Merkur, has belonged to the Starwood hotel chain since 2003, and since the takeover it has now belonged to the Marriott group. It has 436 rooms on 27 floors, of which 17 are guest floors and 3 are office floors. There is a swimming pool and a wellness area on the 4th floor. The building houses the Gusto, Brühl and Falco restaurants and the Shinto bar/lounge.

From study to realization  
In the concept for the Leipzig Trade Fair in 1971, the construction of additional hotels for trade fair visitors from abroad was a priority task. The urban planners from the office of the chief architect of the city of Leipzig had examined and proposed several locations. But things turned out differently. The draft by the architects from Tokyo's Kajima Corporation was already complete; the only thing that had to be done in Leipzig was finding a suitable plot of land and making it available. A location was chosen that had not previously been intended for a high-rise dominant.

The contract to build the 5-star hotel was signed in 1978 between the GDR foreign trade company Limex and the Japan GDR Project Company. Kajima took over the project planning and execution. The cost of construction was 16.1 billion Japanese yen. This corresponded to around 157 million Deutschmarks at an average exchange rate traded on international exchange markets on 1 January 1981. The foundation stone was laid in September 1978. All of the precast concrete parts needed to build the outer facades were delivered from West Berlin. On 31 January 1981 Kajima handed over the import object to the Interhotel association.

On 13 March 1981, at the same time as the opening of the Frühjahrsmesse (Spring Trade Show), the hotel was also opened under the name Hotel Merkur. In addition to ministers and state secretaries of the GDR, about 100 representatives of Japanese business were present.

The construction company (shell construction) was Dyckerhoff & Widmann AG (DYWIDAG Berlin/West branch), which also had the precast concrete parts delivered from West Berlin. The lift assembly was carried out by a Japanese company. AB Svenska Fläktfabriken from Sweden took over the heating, air conditioning and plumbing. East German companies were involved in the construction, from the interior fittings to the flat roof sealing (VEB Spezialbau Magdeburg) and plumbing (sheet metal work).

The hotel then and now 
When it opened, the Hotel Merkur had 447 air-conditioned rooms and apartments with 700 beds, twelve restaurants, bars and clubs with a total of 800 seats - including the nationality restaurant Sakura, the second Japanese restaurant in the GDR after a restaurant in Suhl - as well as five salons and a 265-seat banquet and convention center. The hotel employed 740 people, including 110 at the Intershop. The hotel had 15 in-house vehicles from the Wartburg, Lada and Volvo brands. The hotel also had its own passport and visa office.

In January 1987 the 15th Congress of Internists met in the hotel, in April the International Congress of the Anatomical Society; in September of the same year, the 23rd anniversary of the European Association for the Study of Diabetes. On 8 March 1990, Leipzig's first casino (still during the German reunification) opened in the Hotel Merkur.  In the top ten list of the Allgemeine Hotel- und Gastronomie-Zeitung (AHGZ) in 1991, the Hotel Merkur was ranked 8th among the best hotels in Germany.

The Treuhandanstalt initially continued to run the Interhotels, but later sold it to investors. On 1 January 1993, the Interhotel Merkur became the Hotel InterContinental Leipzig and part of the Intercontinental Hotels Group. Between 1993 and 1994 a total of 43 million DM was invested in the renovation and conversion of the house. On the occasion of the 50th anniversary of Inter-Continental Hotels & Resorts, the hotel initiated the environmental and benefit campaign "One Day for Leipzig" in 1996.

At the end of 2002, the four-star hotel was taken over by the Westin chain; since 1 January 2003, it has operated as The Westin Leipzig. On 28 April 2005, the Falco restaurant was opened on the 27th floor under the direction of Peter Maria Schnurr. In 2007 the gourmet restaurant received its first Michelin star  and in 2008 the Falco received its second Michelin star. It was the first restaurant in the new federal states with two Michelin stars.

On the occasion of the hotel's 30th anniversary (2011), Bild published details from the Stasi file of the Hotel Merkur with "personal records of sex for sale, clumsy spies and hotel employees who even betrayed their own colleagues".

In October 2021, there was a media discussion about the hotel after the singer Gil Ofarim claimed to have been treated Anti-semitically by a receptionist because of his Star of David necklace. The employee filed a defamation complaint against Ofarim and a threatening complaint based on social media posts. The hotel initially put two employees on leave  and hired a law firm to investigate. This found no evidence of criminal or labor law measures against the employees. The case was submitted to the public prosecutor's office for legal review. According to media reports, no chain with a visible Star of David could be identified on the surveillance videos of the hotel. After the investigation was completed, the public prosecutor's office in Leipzig dropped the case against the hotel employee and brought charges of defamation and false suspicion against Ofarim. The case against Ofarim is suspended.

Awards 
 2007 Restaurant of the Year for the Falco
 2007 first Michelin star for the Falco
 2008 second Michelin star for the Falco

See also 
 List of high rise buildings in Leipzig

Literature 
 Wolfgang Hocquél, Leipzig. Architektur von der Romanik bis zur Gegenwart, 2. stark erweiterte Auflage, Passage Verlag, Leipzig 2004, ISBN 3-932900-54-5, p. 173f.
 Annette Menting, Leipzig. Architektur und Kunst, Reclams Städteführer, Reclam-Verlag, Ditzingen 2022, ISBN  978-3-15-014310-0, p. 102f.

Footnotes

External links

 The Westin Leipzig at Marriott.com
 East Germany and Japan 1: Kajima Corporation, 30 November 2013, in the Sydney-based blog of Ben Bansal
 Photo series by Andreas Rost on the beauty contest at the Hotel Merkur in February 1990 retrieved 2023-02-21
 German-Israeli singer charged with lying about antisemitism at hotel in: Times of Israel, 19 October 2022, retrieved 2023-02-20

Buildings and structures in Leipzig
Skyscraper hotels in Germany
Buildings and structures completed in 1981
East German architecture
Volkseigene Betriebe